Palchoqlu may refer to:
 Palchoqlu, Charuymaq
 Palchoqlu, Maragheh